is one of the largest pharmaceutical companies in Japan. It is headquartered in Chuo-ku, Osaka, Japan, with its major plants in Higashinari-ku, Osaka, and Fujinomiya, Shizuoka., and its central research institute at Minase, Shimamoto-cho, Mishima District, Osaka.

Ono Pharmaceutical's roots go back to 1717 when Ichibei Ono started his dealer business of pharmaceuticals in Osaka. His business expanded and changed its name a few times, and became Ono Pharmaceutical Industrial Co., Ltd. in 1948.

Ono has been listed in Tokyo Stock Exchange since 1963. Its consolidated earnings in the half year ending in March 2018 were 16 billion Japanese yen.

Nivolumab, the cancer drug based on the research of Prof.Dr. Tasuku Honjo of Kyoto University, who received the Nobel Prize later in 2018, is marketed by both Ono Pharmaceutical and Bristol-Myers Squibb.

See also

Opdivo
Bristol-Myers Squibb

References

External links
Official site 

Pharmaceutical companies of Japan
Health care companies of Japan
Biotechnology companies of Japan
Companies listed on the Tokyo Stock Exchange
Companies based in Osaka
Pharmaceutical companies established in 1717
1717 establishments in Japan
Japanese brands
Mitsubishi